Canterbury Rugby League is the regional body that administers rugby league in Canterbury, New Zealand. CRL manages local competitions from senior level down to age group competitions. Canterbury Rugby League also manages the Canterbury rugby league team which represents the region in New Zealand competitions. Previously teams have competed in the Bartercard Cup and Lion Red Cup. The CRL is currently part of the South Island Zone which includes the Tasman, West Coast, Otago and Southland regions.

Rugby League Park
Canterbury Rugby League had a long term lease on Rugby League Park which was formerly known as the Addington Showgrounds.

In 2011 due to the Christchurch earthquake the Grand stands became too dangerous to inhabit and Canterbury Rugby League were displaced until 2019 when in conjunction with the Christchurch City council, Rugby League purpose built facilities were built at the Nga Puna Wai Sports hub and will be officially opened on 23 February 2019 with an exhibition match between the NZ Warriors and the Canterbury Bulls.

Local Competition
Eight teams currently compete in the Pat Smith Trophy Premiership;
Linwood Keas
Northern Bulldogs
Celebration Lions
Aranui Eagles (Renamed Eastern Eagles in 2018)
Halswell Hornets
Papanui Tigers
Riccarton Knights
Hornby Panthers

The winner is awarded the Smith Trophy, which dates back to 1913.

History

Foundation
The organisation was founded on 13 July 1912 at a meeting that included William Moyle, Robert Brunsden, New Zealand representative Charlie Pearce and David McPhail, who had played with St. Helens and Wigan. A.E. Hooper was elected chairman on 17 July and would serve in that position until 1922. Henry Thacker, a mayor and MP, was the first president of the CRL and served from 1912 until 1929. He donated the Thacker Shield in 1913.

Canterbury first played on 7 September 1912 at the Show Grounds against Wellington. Ernie Buckland scored the first rugby league try in Canterbury as Wellington prevailed 5-4. The first local club competition was held in 1913, with four clubs participating. Addington was founded on 31 January 1913, Sydenham one week later on 7 February, Linwood on 12 March and on 14 March St. Albans was formed. The first Canterbury Rugby League Annual General Meeting was held on 31 March 1913.

Touring teams
In 1955 Canterbury defeated the touring French side 24-12. They defeated Great Britain 18-10, in 1990.

Glory Years
The early nineties saw a regional Canterbury side that included many future stars. The side was coached by Frank Endacott and included players such as captain Mark Nixon, Mike Culley, Quentin Pongia, Terry Hermansson, Whetu Taewa, Logan Edwards, Brendon Tuuta, Simon Angell and Mike Dorreen. With the creation of the Lion Red Cup however, many moved franchises and eventually ended up in Australia or England.

Lion Red Cup
In the Lion Red Cup, from 1994–1996, Canterbury was represented by the Christchurch City Shiners and the Canterbury Country Cardinals.

Bartercard Cup
The Canterbury Bulls competed in the Bartercard Cup from 2000–2007, winning the title in 2000 & 2003. They were the only franchise from the South Island and the only franchise to play in every season.

Bartercard Premiership
The Canterbury Bulls competed in the 2008 and 2009 Bartercard Premiership, winning the 2009 competition.

The Canterbury side was again be coached by Brent Stuart and Dave Perkins. Former Kiwis assistant coach and Bartercard cup winning Phil Prescott returned as the director of coaching. The Canterbury U16s and U18s sides were involved in curtain raiser matches before the Senior home games.

Notable Juniors

Aranui Eagles
Jamayne Isaako (2018-Brisbane Broncos)

Halswell Hornets
Matt McIlwrick (2012- Canberra Raiders & Sydney Roosters)
Aaron Whittaker (Wakefield Trinity & Auckland Warriors)

Hornby Panthers
David Kidwell (1997-09 Adelaide Rams, Parramatta Eels, Sydney Roosters, Melbourne Storm & South Sydney Rabbitohs)
Brendon Tuuta (Western Reds & Castleford Tigers)
Corey Lawrie (New Zealand Warriors)
Rulon Nutira (St George-Illawarra Dragons)
Nu Brown (Cronulla Sharks & Canterbury-Bankstown Bulldogs)
Jordan Riki (2019-Brisbane Broncos)

Linwood Keas
Brent Todd (Canberra Raiders & Gold Coast Seagulls)
Sui Pauaraisa (NZ Warriors Women)

Northern Bulldogs
Matt Duffie (2010- Melbourne Storm)
Papanui Tigers
Setaimata Sa (2006-14 Sydney Roosters, Catalans Dragons & Hull F.C.)
Shane Endacott (Auckland Warriors)
Riccarton Knights
Lewis Brown (2009- New Zealand Warriors & Penrith Panthers)
Logan Edwards (Auckland Warriors)
Quentin Pongia (Canberra Raiders, Sydney Roosters & Auckland Warriors)

Burnham Chevaliers
Jayden Nikorima (Sydney Roosters)
Kodi Nikorima (Brisbane Broncos) (Auckland Warriors)
Jazz Tevaga (New Zealand Warriors)

Sydenham Swans
Pita Godinet (New Zealand Warriors & Wests Tigers)

References

Rugby league in Canterbury, New Zealand
Rugby league governing bodies in New Zealand